Frederick John Shaw Britnell  (16 April 1899 – 1980) was a flying ace in the Royal Naval Air Service and Royal Air Force during World War I. He was credited with nine aerial victories. He returned to service for World War II, remaining in the Royal Air Force until 1954.

Early life
Frederick John Shaw Britnell was born in High Wycombe, Buckinghamshire, England on 16 April 1899.

World War I
Just past his 18th birthday on 3 June 1917, Britnell was appointed a Flight Officer in Royal Naval Air Service on the same day as John Denis Breakey. On 27 October 1917, he was promoted to temporary Flight Sub-Lieutenant.

By early 1918, he had been posted to 3 Naval Squadron; he scored his first aerial victory with them on 10 March 1918. His victory streak with them continued as the unit transitioned into 203 Squadron RAF, culminating in his destruction of an observation balloon on 2 October 1918.

His bravery was rewarded with a Distinguished Flying Cross, although the citation for it was not gazetted until after war's end, on 8 February 1919:
This officer has flown about 500 hours on active service, and on all occasions, when engaged with the enemy, has shown great dash and marked courage. He has carried out some 162 special missions, and has engaged enemy troops, transport, &c., from very low altitudes with great success.

Post World War I
Britnell survived the war. On 30 August 1919, he transferred to the Royal Air Force's unemployed list; with that, he dropped from history's eye for almost two decades.

On 10 May 1938, he was commissioned in the Equipment Branch of the Royal Air Force Volunteer Reserve as an acting Pilot Officer with seniority from 15 May 1936. On 10 November 1938, he was promoted to Flying Officer. On 16 December 1941, he was promoted from flight lieutenant to squadron leader.

On 10 February 1954, he relinquished his commission while retaining the rank of Squadron Leader.

Britnell's retirement life and eventual death remain unknown.

List of aerial victories

References

1899 births
1980 deaths
People from High Wycombe
Royal Naval Air Service personnel of World War I
Royal Air Force personnel of World War I
British World War I flying aces
Royal Air Force Volunteer Reserve personnel of World War II
Recipients of the Distinguished Flying Cross (United Kingdom)
Royal Air Force squadron leaders